Alot Assembly constituency is one of the 230 assembly constituencies of Madhya Pradesh a central Indian state. Alot is also part of Ujjain Lok Sabha constituency.

Members of Legislative Assembly

 1957: Devisingh, Indian National Congress
 1962: Mayaram Nanda, Indian National Congress
 1967: Madanlal, Jan Sangh
 1972: Lila Devi Choudhary, Indian National Congress
 1977: Lila Devi Choudhary, Janata Party
 1980: Thawar Chand Gehlot, Bharatiya Janata Party
 1985: Nathulal Sisodiya, Bharatiya Janata Party
 1990: Thawar Chand Gehlot, Bharatiya Janata Party
 1993: Thawar Chand Gehlot, Bharatiya Janata Party
 1998: Manohar Utwal, Bharatiya Janata Party
 2003: Premchand Guddu, Indian National Congress
 2008: Manohar Utwal, Bharatiya Janata Party
 2013: Jitendra Gehlot, Bharatiya Janata Party

See also

 Ratlam
 Alot
 Ujjain (Lok Sabha constituency)

References

Ratlam
Assembly constituencies of Madhya Pradesh